Malik Anokha (born 1943, Died:2008, Age:65 years) was a Pakistani film, television, stage and radio actor from Mirpur Khas, Sindh.

Life and work
Anokha was fluent in several languages. His career spanned more than forty years, during which he acted in a number of media, both within Pakistan and abroad, including the European film Traffik. He mostly acted in Sindhi films and dramas in the 1960s and early 1970s. After the downfall of the Sindhi film industry, Anokha moved to Lahore and worked on films, television shows, and theater. In the early 1980s, he returned to Karachi and worked in television and on the stage. Until the end of his life, he remained associated with the entertainment industry.

He earned many awards in his career including the Nigar Awards and the NTM Viewers Choice Awards for best actor for the drama serial Kashkol, and also received an award from the culture department of the government of Sindh for his performance in the theater drama Azadi Kay Mujrim.

Malik Anokha died on 26 July 2008 due to a heart attack. He was buried at the Sakhi Hassan graveyard in Karachi.
He was survived by his widow, three daughters and a son.

Filmography
	Aisa Bhi Hota Hai 
	Chori Chupay 
	Shehro Feroze 
	Munjho Piar Pukarey 
	Badal Ain Barsat 
	Rut Ja Rishta 
	Dharti Lahe Kunwar 
	Dharti Dilwaran Ji 
	Aj Ta Bhakar Payon 
	Hazir Saien
	Umeed 
	Hakim Khan 
	Toofan 
	Dushman 
	Mahran Ja Moti 
	Beus 
	Meeran Jamali 
	Dubai Chalo
	Saima
	Panuu Aqil
	Jeejal Maah
	Methra Shar Milan
	Ghughant Lahy Kunhar
	Dharti Dilwaran Ji
	Pyar Kiyo Singhar
	Albeli
	Kismat
	Sodha Putt Sindh Jaa
	Gharat Jo Sawal
	Janwar
	Naam Ka Nawab
	Khush Naseeb
	Gabroo
	Minzil
	Shikanja
	Mafroor
	Double Cross
	Sarjant
	Dard

Dramas
	Chanan Te Darya 
	Tajay Ki Bethak
	Wah Punhal Wah
	Jag Beti
	Dubai Chalo
	Aik Haqeeqat Sau Afsanay
	Karwan
	Barzakh
	Seerihan
	Mandi
	Nijaat
	Ba Adab Ba Mulahiza Hoshiar
	Akhero
	Parbhat
	Kashkol
	Fankar Gale
	Hum To Chalay Susral
	Wah Bhai Wah
	Kantoon Say Agay
	Barish
	Nimmo Papad Wali
	Wahi Khuda Hai
	Amar Bail
	Kala Pul
	Babu Bay Qaboo
	Baat Bay Baat
	Bhaj Punhal Bhaj
	Khwab Suhanay
	Janam
	Pani Ka Ghar
	Kya Baat Hai
	Waris
	Ishrat Baji
	Ghora Ya Gaari
	Cheh Chitto
	Halat
	Pehla Chand
	Shughal-e-Azam
	Yes Sir
	Ajanabi
	Hal Punhal Hal

See also 
 List of Lollywood actors

References

External links
 
 
 Malik Anokha laid to rest - Daily Dawn

1943 births
2008 deaths
People from Mirpur Khas District
Pakistani male film actors
Pakistani male television actors
Pakistani male stage actors
Pakistani male comedians
Pakistani Sunni Muslims
Pakistani male radio actors
Male actors from Karachi
Radio personalities from Karachi
20th-century comedians